The Business Style Handbook: An A-to-Z Guide for Effective Writing on the Job, usually called The Business Style Handbook, is a 280-page style guide tailored to people who write on the job. The authors are Helen Cunningham and Brenda Greene.

History 
McGraw-Hill published the first edition in 2002 and the second edition in 2012. In 2003, McGraw-Hill published the book in complex Chinese. In 2004, China Financial and Economic Publishing House published a simplified Chinese edition.  Tata McGraw-Hill released an Indian edition in 2003.

Focus 
This style guide focuses on business communications and is tailored for people who write on the job, which distinguishes it from style guides that are written from a journalism perspective. To develop the book, the authors surveyed communications executives at Fortune 500 companies. Results of that survey are summarized in the first chapter. The book also includes a 200-page section of A-to-Z entries on usage, grammar, punctuation and spelling for words and phrases commonly used in business writing.

Example: ampersand (&) Use the ampersand in an organization’s formal name if that is
what the organization uses, as in Barnes & Noble (do not write Barnes and Noble).
But do not use the & in place of and in text. Write Trinidad and Tobago, not
Trinidad & Tobago. If, however, you are using abbreviations, replace and with &,
so that research and development becomes R&D, profit and loss becomes P&L.

The Business Style Handbook is on the recommended reading list for Microsoft Education Written Competencies  and is found in university libraries around the world.

It is frequently recommended for business writing courses at universities, including USC Annenberg School for Communication and Journalism. Writing institutes, such as Borders Connect, a U.K. learning provider, also use the book for courses.

Organization 
The Business Style Handbook is organized as follows.

Acknowledgments
Cites the Fortune 500 companies and communications executives who participated in the authors’ surveys for the first and second editions of the book.

Introduction
Describes the purpose of the book and its methodology.

Fortune 500 Survey Results
A summary of findings from the authors’ survey on writing practices at Fortune 500 companies. For example, it quotes one respondent who states, “No matter the level of employee, clearly communicating ideas is critical to the success of initiatives.”

Why Style Matters 
Discusses the importance of writing well to establish credibility in business. For example, “Good communication skills are increasingly viewed as a core competency in the corporate world.”

The Case for Standards
Reviews the benefits organizations can gain from helping employees strengthen their writing skills.

Write with Purpose
Outlines  how to approach writing strategically.

Email: Before You Hit Send
Gives recommendations for best practices in business emails, such as how to use cc, bcc and Reply to All appropriately.

The A-to-Z Entries
A 200-page section of entries on usage, grammar, punctuation and spelling for words and phrases relevant for business writing.

Example:  bottom line, bottom-line  Two words when used as a noun, as in How will the price increase impact the bottom line? Write with a hyphen when used as an adjective: It is too soon to assess to the bottom-line impact of the price increases.

References

Style guides for American English
McGraw-Hill books
2002 non-fiction books
2012 non-fiction books